Paul Halley (born 1952 in Romford, England) is a keyboardist, vocalist and composer. He is perhaps best known as being a member of and composer for the Paul Winter Consort.

Biography 
Paul Halley was born in England in 1952. His father was a musician, and when he emigrated with his family to Canada, he sang in the choir of St. Matthew's Church, Ottawa.

After leaving the Cathedral in 1989, Halley founded Joyful Noise, Inc., a non-profit organization, designed to teach children proper vocal technique, music theory, and musicianship. The two groups involved with the organization, Chorus Angelicus and Gaudeamus, are both still active.

From July 2007 to December 2021 Halley served as Director of Music at both the University of King's College and All Saints Cathedral in Halifax, Nova Scotia.

Discography
Nightwatch (1982)
Pianosong (1986)
New Friend (1986) with Eugene Friesen
Whales Alive (1987) with Paul Winter and Leonard Nimoy
Angel on a Stone Wall (1991)
Voices of Light (1994)
Christmas Angelicus (1995)
Sound Over All Waters (1998) with Theresa Thomason
Triptych (2000)
Let Us Keep The Feast (2014)
In the Wide Awe and Wisdom (2017)

References

External links
 http://www.pelagosmusic.com – Official site

1952 births
21st-century pianists
21st-century organists
21st-century British male musicians
Living people
English organists
British male organists
English pianists
English composers
Grammy Award winners
People from Romford
Paul Winter Consort members
Gramavision Records artists